Joiner is a city in Mississippi County, Arkansas, United States. The population was 498 as of the 2020 census, down from 576 at the 2010 census.

Joiner was the birthplace of record company executive Al Bennett, for whom the character Alvin of Alvin and the Chipmunks was named.

Geography
Joiner is located in southern Mississippi County at  (35.507345, -90.150245). U.S. Route 61 passes through the city center, leading northeast  to Osceola and southwest  to Turrell.

Demographics

2020 census

As of the 2020 United States Census, there were 498 people, 227 households, and 100 families residing in the city.

2010 census
As of the 2010 United States Census, there were 576 people living in the city. The racial makeup of the city was 50.0% White, 47.2% Black and 0.2% Native American. 2.6% were Hispanic or Latino of any race.

2000 census
As of the census of 2000, there were 540 people, 197 households, and 139 families living in the city. The racial makeup of the city was 52.78% White, 45.93% Black or African American, 0.37% from other races, and 0.93% from two or more races.  0.74% of the population were Hispanic or Latino of any race.

There were 197 households, out of which 37.1% had children under the age of 18 living with them, 39.1% were married couples living together, 26.4% had a female householder with no husband present, and 29.4% were non-families. 25.4% of all households were made up of individuals, and 11.7% had someone living alone who was 65 years of age or older.  The average household size was 2.74 and the average family size was 3.29.

In the city, the population was spread out, with 29.8% under the age of 18, 12.0% from 18 to 24, 23.5% from 25 to 44, 21.9% from 45 to 64, and 12.8% who were 65 years of age or older.  The median age was 33 years. For every 100 females, there were 80.0 males.  For every 100 females age 18 and over, there were 72.3 males.

The median income for a household in the city was $26,875, and the median income for a family was $30,000. Males had a median income of $28,750 versus $20,208 for females. The per capita income for the city was $10,454.  About 27.7% of families and 27.5% of the population were below the poverty line, including 35.3% of those under age 18 and 23.4% of those age 65 or over.

References

Cities in Arkansas
Cities in Mississippi County, Arkansas